The term  jilbāb or jilbaab refers to any long and loose-fit coat or outer garment worn by some Muslim women. Wearers believe that this definition of jilbab fulfills the Quranic choice for a hijab. Jilbab, jubbah or jilaabah is also known as chador  by Persian speakers in Iran and Afghanistan. The modern jilbāb covers the entire body. Some women will also cover the hands with gloves and the face along with a niqāb. In recent years, a short visor is often included to protect the face from the tropical sun.

Qur'an and hadith

The plural of jilbāb, jalabib, is found in the Qur'an, verse 33:59 (Surah Al-Ahzab). A popular translation by Yusuf Ali goes of the transliterated Arabic goes, 

Yā ’ay-yuha n-Nabiy-yu qul li’azwājika wabanātika wa nisā’i l-mu’minīna yudnīna ‘alayhin-na min jalābībihin-na; dhālika adnā an yu’rafna falā yu’dhayn. Wakāna l-lāhu Ghafūra(n) r-Rahīmā(n)

O Prophet! Tell thy wives and daughters, and the believing women, that they should cast their [jalabib] (Jilbabs) over their persons (when abroad): that is most convenient, that they should be known (as such) and not molested. And Allah is Oft-Forgiving, Most Merciful.

This is the following from the Quran which explains how a Muslim woman must act and dress:

"Tell the believing men that they shall subdue their eyes (and not stare at the women), and to maintain their chastity. This is purer for them. God is fully Cognizant of everything they do. And tell the believing women to subdue their eyes, and maintain their chastity. They shall not reveal any parts of their bodies, except that which is necessary. They shall cover their chests, and shall not relax this code in the presence of other than their husbands, their fathers, the fathers of their husbands, their sons, the sons of their husbands, their brothers, the sons of their brothers, the sons of their sisters, other women, the male servants or employees whose sexual drive has been nullified, or the children who have not reached puberty. They shall not strike their feet when they walk in order to shake and reveal certain details of their bodies. All of you shall repent to GOD, O you believers, that you may succeed." (Quran 24:30-31)

A number of hadith commenting on the above verse of the Qur'an (33:59) mention the jilbab.

Narrated Safiyah bint Shaibah: 'Aisha used to say: "When (the Verse): "They should draw their jalabib over their necks and bosoms," was revealed, (the ladies) cut their waist sheets at the edges and covered their faces with the cut pieces." (Sahih Bukhari, Volume 6, Book 60, Number #282)

Narrated Umm Atiyya: We were ordered to bring out our menstruating women and screened women to the religious gatherings and invocation of the Muslims on the two Eid festivals. These menstruating women were to keep away from the musalla. A woman asked, "O Messenger of Allah! What about one who does not have a jilbab?". He said, "Let her borrow the jilbab of her companion". (Sahih Bukhari, Book 8, #347)

Overview

Since there are no pictures of 7th century jilbab, nor any surviving garments, it is not at all clear if the modern jilbab is the same garment as that referred to in the Qur'an. In general terms, jilbab is a garment/sheet that is worn on the head, draped around the body and that totally covers the body of the woman.

Some modern Muslims insist that the contemporary jilbab and the garment described in the Qur'an and the hadith are exactly the same, and that the Qur'an therefore requires the believer to wear 'these' garments. Some scholars say that a veil is not compulsory in front of blind, asexual or gay men.

The Encyclopedia of Islam identifies over a hundred terms for dress parts, many of which are used for "veiling" (Encyclopedia of Islam 1986: 745–6).

Some of these and related Arabic terms are burqu, ‘abayah, tarhah, bumus, jilbab, jellabah, hayik, milayah, gallabiyyah, dishdasha, gargush, gins’, mungub, lithma, yashmik, habarah, izar. A few terms refer to items used as face covers only. These are qina, burqu, niqab, lithma. Others refer to headcovers that are situationally held by the individual to cover part of the face. These are khimar, sitara, abayah or inrrah. (El Guindi 1999 p. 7)

Traditional Islamic costume for women seems to have included the abaya, the chador, and the burqa, as well as many other forms of dress and headcovering.

Sports wear
A new type of athletic jilbab has been developed by Nike. This allows women to play volleyball while still respecting a traditional clothing style.

Indonesian definition 
Jilbab, in Indonesia is used to refer to a headscarf rather than a long and loose overgarment.

See also

 Hijab
 Thawb
 Bisht
 Izar
 Shabina Begum
 Islam and clothing

Notes

References
 El Guindi, Fadwa,Veil: Modesty, Privacy, and Resistance,  Berg, 1999
 Geertz, Clifford,Available Light: Anthropological Reflections on Philosophical Topics, Princeton University Press, 2000

External links

Islamic female clothing
Arabic clothing
Middle Eastern clothing
Dresses
Scarves
Headgear
Purdah
Religious headgear